The Arab American Association of New York is an Arab American and Muslim civil rights organization located in New York.

Linda Sarsour was the former executive director of the organization until stepping down from the position in 2017.

References

External links

Civil rights organizations in the United States
Organizations established in 2001